Sultan Al Neyadi is an Emirati astronaut and one of the first two astronauts from the United Arab Emirates, along with Hazza Al Mansouri.

Personal life 
Sultan Al Neyadi was born in Um Ghafa, a remote area outside Al Ain. He lived his childhood in his grandfather's house. He went to Um Ghafa Primary Boys School and Um Ghafa Secondary School. His father served in the UAE Armed Forces. He is an avid practitioner of Brazilian jiu-jitsu and started training in the sport in 2016.

Education and career 
After high school, Sultan joined the UAE Armed Forces. He studied in Britain at the University of Brighton, where he received a BSc (Hons) in Electronics and Communications Engineering in 2004. After being selected to become one of the first two Emirati astronauts, university vice-chancellor Debra Humphris said, "We are so proud of our graduate and will be watching his endeavours as an astronaut with great interest."

After going back to the UAE, he studied at Zayed Military College for a year. He worked in the UAE Armed Forces as a communications engineer.

In 2008, he went to Australia and received a master's degree in Information and Networks Security from Griffith University, where he returned in 2011 to complete a PhD in Data Leakage Prevention Technology.

Astronaut career 
Al Neyadi was one of two people selected from 4,022 candidates to become the first Emirati astronauts, following a series of mental and physical tests in the UAE and Russia. He went through the UAE Astronaut Programme at the Mohammed bin Rashid Space Centre.

On 3 September 2018, UAE Prime Minister Mohammed bin Rashid Al Maktoum tweeted: "We announced today our first astronauts to the International Space Station: Hazza Al Mansouri and Sultan Al Nayadi. Hazza and Sultan represent all young Arabs and represent the pinnacle of the UAE's ambitions."

It was later announced that Al Mansouri would fly the first mission, with Al Neyadi as his back up, meaning Al Mansouri did his preparations to become the first person from the UAE to fly in space and Al Neyadi did his preparations to step in and fly the mission if anything were to happen to Al Mansouri that would compromise him flying the mission. Al Mansouri launched on Soyuz MS-15 on 25 September 2019 for an approximately eight-day mission on the ISS before returning to Earth on 3 October 2019.

The MBRSC and Roscosmos engaged in negotiations to support a six-month ISS mission for a crew member from the UAE, which would be the first long-duration space mission in the Arab World. Al Neyadi would be the logical choice for the mission. However, it was announced in April 2022 that MBRSC instead acquired a seat from Axiom Space for a UAE astronaut to travel to the ISS on NASA’s crew rotation flight, SpaceX Crew-6. In July, Al Neyadi was officially assigned this seat, and reached space for the first time in March 2023.

References

External links
Sultan Al Neyadi's Griffith University Profile

Emirati astronauts
Emirati electrical engineers
Emirati expatriates in Australia
Emirati expatriates in the United Kingdom
Emirati military engineers
Living people
People from Al Ain
1981 births
Griffith University alumni
Alumni of the University of Brighton